; stylized as B/S/H/) is the largest manufacturer of home appliances in Europe and one of the leading companies in the sector worldwide. The group stemmed from a joint venture set up in May 1967 between Robert Bosch GmbH (Stuttgart) and Siemens AG (Munich), and it posted annual sales of 15.6 billion euros in the year 2021. BSH is an abbreviation for Bosch und Siemens Hausgeräte.

Today, BSH operates some 40 factories in Europe, the USA, Latin America and Asia. Together with a global network of sales, production, and service companies, the BSH conglomerate today is made up of about 80 companies in 50 countries, with a total workforce of about 62,000 people. In September 2014, Robert Bosch GmbH agreed to purchase Siemens' 50% stake in the joint venture for 3 billion euros.

The BSH product range includes large home appliances for cooking, dish-washing, laundry (washing, drying and folding), refrigeration and freezing, as well as a multitude of small appliances, such as fully automatic espresso machines, floor care and hot water appliances (consumer products).

History

1967-1978: Establishment and National Consolidation 
BSH Hausgeräte GmbH (formerly Bosch-Siemens Hausgeräte GmbH – BSHG) was founded in 1967 as a joint venture between Robert Bosch in Stuttgart and Siemens Munich. At that time, BSH maintained factories in Berlin, Giengen, and Traunreut, Germany. In 1976, BSH acquired Pitsos in Athens, Greece (BSH Ikiakes Syskeveses A.B.E.) and at that time increased the number of its production sites with factories in Dillingen, Germany, and Athens, Greece.  

In 1978, the administration role moved to a new building in Hochstrasse in Munich. The shared, centrally located administration building laid the cornerstone for BSH's corporate identity and functioned as a clearly visible external sign of the internal amalgamation.

1979-1983: National Growth 
The relatively short period between 1979 and 1983 was a phase of national growth for BSH. In 1982, BSH acquired the Neff brand and established Neff GmbH in Munich. A factory was then added in Bretten, Germany.

1984-2002: Sustainability and Internationalization 
BSH embarked on a course of international expansion between the years 1984 and 2002. 

A new phase commenced for BSH in 1984: the internationalization of the company. The aim was to systematically develop the German exporter into a global home appliance company with an international technology, marketing and sales network. BSH essentially expanded in countries where the home appliance market was growing or showed potential for growth.    

The initial strategy centered around the founding of the sales and customer service companies in Europe in the 1980s:  1984 and 1986 in Great Britain and Spain, 1985 and 1987 in France and 1987 in Greece and Norway.  

In Spain in the years 1988/89, BSH acquired Balay in Saragossa and purchased Safel in Pamplona, which included factories in Estella, Pamplona, Santander, and Saragossa. 

The topic of environmental protection became increasingly important in a social context at the end of the 1980s. The existence of holes in the ozone layer was well known, for example, from 1985. The Montreal agreement on protecting the ozone layer was concluded three years later. The factory in Giengen was already producing refrigerators with half the CFC consumption from 1988.  Management established the Corporate Environmental Protection department in 1991 and the first environmental report was published one year later. This was the starting point for the company's commitment to the environment. European production switched to CFC-free refrigerators in 1993 and HFCs have also been banned from BSH's European refrigerators since 1994.

In 1993, BSH increased its holdings in the small home appliances sector with its takeover of the Kleingerätefabrik MGA Mali Gospodinski Aparati small appliance factory in Nazarje, Slovenia.  

In 1994, BSH founded the BSW Household Appliances Co. in China as a joint venture with the Wuxi Little Swan Group and began manufacturing and selling washing machines in Wuxi. It also acquired Gaggenau Hausgeräte in Germany. During this same year in Brazil, BSH acquired the voting capital stock of the Brazilian home appliance manufacturer Continental 2001, São Paulo, which was then known as BSH Continental Eletrodomésticos (subsidiary sold in 2009). 

In 1995, BSH obtained a majority interest in PEG Profilo Elektrikli Gereçler Sanayii A.Ş. in Istanbul, thus adding another production site to its portfolio in Çerkezköy, Turkey. In Germany, the factory in Nauen, Brandenburg, was added.  

BSY Cooling Appliances Co., Ltd. was founded in China in 1996, which today operates under the name BSH Home Appliances Co., Ltd. Refrigerators and freezers were manufactured and sold in Chuzhou, China. During that same year, a majority interest was acquired in the home appliance manufacturer Coldex, S.A. in Lima, Peru, and production sites were added in Chuzhou, China; Lima, Peru; and Bad Neustadt, Germany.  

In 1997/98, BSH primarily expanded its holdings the U.S. BSH Home Appliances Partnership was founded in New Bern, North Carolina – now called "BSH Home Appliances Corporation" (formerly in Huntington Beach, California; since 2012, in Irvine, California), adding the New Bern manufacturing site to its factories.  

The U.S. home appliance manufacturer Thermador in Huntington Beach, California, was acquired in 1998, as was EDS Electronics, Drives and Systems in Regensburg, Germany/Michalovce, Slovakia, and a manufacturer of small home appliances in Ufesa, Spain. This was followed by the acquisition of additional production sites in Łódź, Poland; Chernogolovka, Russia; Michalovce, Slovakia; Vitoria and Echarri-Aranaz, Spain; and La Follette, Tennessee and Vernon, Vermont in the U.S. 

In 2001, BSH established BHST Washing Appliances Ltd. in Kabinburi, Thailand in a joint venture with the Hitachi Group. The factory in Thailand opened in 2002. In New Bern, North Carolina, the cornerstone was laid for a new washing machine factory and a new dishwasher factory was opened in Łódź, Poland.

2003-2013: International Consolidation 
Stove production in the U.S. began in 2003, as well as the production of washing machines and dryers. BSH also moved to a new group headquarters in Munich-Neuperlach, Germany. In 2004, BSH bought out Fedders, which produced room air conditioners in Estella, Spain. That same year, the cornerstone was laid for a dryer factory in Łódź, Poland, and BSH Electrical Appliances (Jiangsu) Co. Ltd. was founded in Nanjing, China. 

In 2005, BSH purchased a plot for a refrigerator/freezer factory in Strelna, a suburb of Saint Petersburg, Russia, as well as laying the cornerstone for Appliance Park in Nanjing, China, and opening the new dryer factory in Łódź, Poland. In 2006, dishwasher production began in Çerkezköy, Turkey. In 2007, a refrigerator/freezer factory was opened and the cornerstone laid for a washing machine factory in Saint Petersburg, Russia, and for a washing machine factory in Nanjing, China. In 2009, washing machine production started up in Nanjing and BSH Home Appliances Private Limited was founded in Mumbai, India. 

BSH Home Appliances Saudi Arabia LLC was founded in Jeddah, Saudi Arabia in 2010. In 2011, the newly constructed Laundry Technology Center was opened in the Technopark in Berlin, Germany, as a replacement for the Berlin-Gartenfeld location. That same year, ground was broken for a development center for fully automatic coffee machines and espresso machines in Traunreut, Germany. In 2012, BSH opened a washing machine factory in St. Petersburg, Russia. In November 2012, BSH also announced its intention to acquire the Polish home appliance manufacturer Zelmer by means of a public takeover bid. The transaction was completed in March 2013 with the purchase of over 97 percent of Zelmer's capital. Also that year, the cornerstone was laid for the first BSH factory in India, which opened in 2014 in Chennai. In November 2015, BSH laid the cornerstone for its first Chinese dishwasher factory in Chuzhou, specializing in production for the Chinese market.

2014-today: Setting a new course   
On September 22, 2014, Siemens and Bosch announced that Siemens would be selling all its shares in their joint enterprise to Bosch, pending the approval of the antitrust authorities. The sale was completed on January 5, 2015, and from that point on the company was under the sole ownership of Bosch. As part of the acquisition, the company's name was changed to BSH Hausgeräte GmbH. 

In 2020, BSH sold the rights to its Zelmer brand to the Spanish group B&B Trends and sold the production facilities of the former Athens factory to Pyramis. 

Since 2016, "We are BSH" was the new guiding principle. "What drives us: We want to be the first choice for consumers worldwide. We are growing responsibly and doing our part to protect our environment and its natural resources".

Brands

Appliance brands

Global brands 
 Bosch
 Gaggenau
 Neff
 Siemens

Local brands 
 Balay
 Coldex
 Constructa
 Pitsos
 Profilo
 Thermador

Label brands 
 Junker

Service brands 

 Kitchen Stories
 Blue Movement 
 WeWash 

 Simply Yummy 
 Foodfittery

Ecosystem brand 
 Home Connect

Notable Innovations   

 1985: BSH presents the first dishwasher with AquaStop technology, which prevents water damage from burst or detached hoses or hose leaks.  

 2002: BSH founds its first fully retractable patented SLIDE & HIDE oven door which creates space for convenient access to the inside of the oven.
 2006: BSH introduces dishwashers with VarioSpeed technology which reduces running time for the same full performance.
 2008: BSH presents the first dishwasher with zeolite drying system which reduces the energy consumption of dishwashers by 20 percent. The innovation has received awards for accelerating sustainable development. It was awarded the "Innovation Prize for Climate and Environment" from Dr. Norbert Röttgen, German Federal Minister for the Environment, for promoting energy-efficiency products.
 2010: BSH introduces the world's first washing machine with integrated dosing system i-DOS allowing accurate dosing of detergent and thus reduces water consumption.
 2011: BSH launches its first full-surface induction with TFT touch display. The single large cooking surface with full-surface induction allows for pots and pans to be placed anywhere.  

 2021: The first ever portable fabric refresher FreshUp from BSH is launched that removes odours with plasma technology.

References

Manufacturing companies based in Munich
Home appliance brands
Home appliance manufacturers of Germany
Joint ventures
Vacuum cleaner manufacturers
Robert Bosch GmbH